Corpus Christi Army Depot (CCAD) is a United States Department of Defense (DoD) Center of Industrial and Technical Excellence (CITE) for rotary wing aircraft. It has been a tenant of Naval Air Station Corpus Christi since 1961. 

The CCAD mission is to ensure aviation readiness for all service and international sales programs. In 2018 Gail Atkins became the first woman to lead CCAD.

External links
Corpus Christi Army Depot Homepage

Military in Corpus Christi, Texas
Military facilities in Texas
United States Army logistics installations
1961 establishments in Texas

References